The National Guard of the Russian Federation came into being on April 5, 2016 by decree of the President of the Russian Federation № 157.  Being a uniformed paramilitary organisation, it has its own awards system subordinate to State awards of the Russian Federation.

National Guard of the Russian Federation

Medals

Decorations

See also

Awards and decorations of the Russian Federation
Ministerial Awards of the Russian Federation
List of awards of independent services of the Russian Federation
Honorary titles of the Russian Federation
Awards and decorations of the Soviet Union
National Guard of Russia
Internal Troops (Russia)
Military history of the Russian Federation

External links
 Official web site of the Russian National Guard In Russian

References

Orders, decorations, and medals of Russia
Russian awards
Military awards and decorations of Russia
National symbols of Russia
Russian and Soviet military-related lists
National Guard of Russia